Víctor Lugo (born 15 April 1954) is a Colombian footballer. He played in two matches for the Colombia national football team in 1985. He was also part of Colombia's squad for the 1979 Copa América tournament.

References

1954 births
Living people
Colombian footballers
Colombia international footballers
Place of birth missing (living people)
Association football forwards
América de Cali footballers
Atlético Nacional footballers
Deportes Quindío footballers
Independiente Santa Fe footballers
Atlético Bucaramanga footballers